James M. Mead (1885–1964) was a U.S. Senator from New York from 1938 to 1947. Senator Mead may also refer to:

Benjamin P. Mead (1849–1913), Connecticut State Senate
Cowles Mead (1776–1844), Mississippi State Senate
Darius Mead (1787–1864), Connecticut State Senate
James R. Mead (judge) (1860s–1934), Connecticut State Senate
James R. Mead (pioneer) (1836–1910), Kansas State Senate
John A. Mead (1841–1920), Vermont State Senate
Major C. Mead (1858–1925), Wisconsin State Senate
Slade Mead (born 1961), Arizona State Senate

See also
George L. Meade (1869–1925), New York State Senate